Janka Čulíková (born 30 June 1987 in Martin, Czechoslovakia) is a Slovakian ice hockey forward.

International career

Čulíková was selected for the Slovakia national women's ice hockey team in the 2010 Winter Olympics. She played in all five games, leading the team with two goals and three points. She played all three games of the qualifying campaign for the 2014 Olympics.

Čulíková has also appeared for Slovakia at eight IIHF Women's World Championships, across three levels. Her first appearance came in 2004. She appeared at the top level championships in 2011, 2012.

Career statistics

International career

References

External links
Eurohockey.com Profile
Sports-Reference Profile

1987 births
Sportspeople from Martin, Slovakia
Living people
Olympic ice hockey players of Slovakia
Ice hockey players at the 2010 Winter Olympics
Slovak women's ice hockey forwards
Universiade medalists in ice hockey
Universiade bronze medalists for Slovakia
Competitors at the 2011 Winter Universiade